Lamin-B receptor is a protein, and in humans, it is encoded by the LBR gene.

Function 

The protein encoded by this gene belongs to the ERG4/ERG24 family. It localizes to the inner membrane of the nuclear envelope and anchors the lamina and the heterochromatin to the membrane. It may mediate the interaction between chromatin and lamin B. Mutations of this gene has been associated with autosomal recessive HEM/Greenberg skeletal dysplasia. Alternative splicing occurs at this locus and two transcript variants encoding the same protein have been identified.

Clinical significance
There is evidence tying it to Greenberg dysplasia and Pelger-Huet anomaly.

Interactions 

Lamin B receptor has been shown to interact with CBX3 and CBX5. LBR also interacts with long non-coding RNA XIST in mouse cells and potentially assist the spreading XIST across X chromosome in differentiating female embryonic stem cells, but it might be redundant for correct XCI in vivo.

References

Further reading

External links 
 

Receptors